The slender-billed vulture (Gyps tenuirostris) is an Old World vulture species native to sub-Himalayan regions and Southeast Asia. It is Critically Endangered since 2002 as the population on the Indian subcontinent has declined rapidly. As of 2021, fewer than 870 mature individuals are thought to remain.

It used to be the Indian vulture, under the name of “long-billed vulture”. However, these two species have non-overlapping distribution ranges and can be immediately told apart by trained observers, even at considerable distances. The Indian vulture is found only to the south of the Ganges and breeds on cliffs while the slender-billed vulture is found along  and nests in trees.

Description 
At , in length, this mid-sized vulture is about the same size as its sister species, the Indian vulture. This vulture is mostly grey with a pale rump and grey undertail coverts. The thighs have whitish down. The neck is long, bare, skinny and black. The black head is angular and narrow with the dark bill appearing narrow midway. The ear opening is prominent and exposed.

Distribution and habitat 
The slender-billed vulture is found in India from the Gangetic plain north, west to Himachal Pradesh, south potentially as far as northern Odisha, and east through Assam. It is also found in north and central Bangladesh, southern Nepal, Burma and Cambodia.

Status and conservation

This species has suffered a marked decline in its numbers in recent years. The population of this species and the Indian vulture declined by 97% overall and in India annual decline rates for both species averaged over 16% between 2000–2007. Wild populations remain from northern and eastern India through southern Nepal and Bangladesh, with a small population in Burma. The only breeding colony in Southeast Asia is in the Steung Treng province of Cambodia. This colony is thought to number about 50–100 birds. The survival of the vultures in Cambodia may have been partly because diclofenac, which is poisonous to vultures, is not available there. The Royal Society for the Protection of Birds (RSPB) has placed the approximate number of slender-billed vultures living beyond confines at about 1,000 in 2009 and predictions estimate total extinction within the next decade amongst the wild population.

The slender-billed vulture is a protected species listed on the appendix II list of CITES, because its numbers have declined rapidly. Its decline is largely due to the use of the non-steroidal anti-inflammatory drug (NSAID) diclofenac in working farm animals. Diclofenac is poisonous to vultures, causing kidney failure, and is being replaced by meloxicam (another NSAID), which is not toxic to vultures. The retail sale of Diclofenac is banned by law in India; however, Diclofenac is still acquired illegally and applied to livestock.

Captive-breeding programs in India are aiming to conserve the species, and it is hoped that vultures can be released back in the wild when the environment is free of diclofenac. Joint efforts between the RSPB and the Zoological Society of London resulted in the first successful captive breeding in 2009. Two slender-billed vultures hatched and are being independently cared for in Haryana and West Bengal.

References

External links 

 Colony of Endangered Vultures Discovered in Cambodia
 BirdLife Species Factsheet.
 Slender-billed vulture videos

slender-billed vulture
Birds of prey of Asia
Birds of Bangladesh
Birds of India
Birds of Nepal
Birds of Eastern Himalaya
Birds of Southeast Asia
Critically endangered fauna of Asia
slender-billed vulture
slender-billed vulture